is a Japanese rugby union player who plays as a Hooker.

References

1992 births
Living people
Japanese rugby union players
Rugby union hookers
Tokyo Sungoliath players
Japan international rugby union players
Sunwolves players
Kobelco Kobe Steelers players